Västra hamnen ("western harbor") is a neighbourhood of Malmö, situated in the borough of Centrum, Malmö Municipality, Skåne County, Sweden. Västra hamnen was an industrial area until the 21st century, when also the last factory closed down. In 1966, Kockums constructed the world's largest dock in Västra hamnen. It is today the most exclusive and expensive neighborhood in Malmö.

Västra Hamnen is also known as "the City of Tomorrow", and is the first district in Europe that claims to be carbon neutral. The district uses aquifer thermal energy storage system to heat buildings in the winter and cool them in the summer. The city of Malmö received a Special Mention award at the Lee Kuan Yew World City Prize 2012 in recognition of its good work at Västra hamnen.

References

Neighbourhoods of Malmö
Redeveloped ports and waterfronts in Sweden